Irina Vadimovna Muravyova (born 8 February 1949) is a Russian film, television and stage actress, who is most known for her performances in Moscow Does Not Believe in Tears (1979), Karnaval (1981), The Most Charming and Attractive (1985) and her work with Maly Theatre of Moscow (since 1993). She was awarded with USSR State Prize, Order of Merit for the Fatherland and Order of Honour.

Biography 
Muravyova was born on 8 February 1949 in Moscow, Russia. In 1982 she graduated from Russian Academy of Theatre Arts. Her first minor film role was in Children of Don Quixote. Her first major film appearance was in the 1974 film A Very English Murder. Her early works include Au-u! (1975) and Duenya (1976). Muravyova gained popularity after appearing in the 1980 film Moscow Does Not Believe In Tears.

Her other screen appearances include Fox Hunting (1980), We, the Undersigned (1981), Hands Up! (1982), The Incredible Bet (1984), Calf Year (1986), Babnik (1990), When Late for ZAGS (1991), Big Trap, or Solo for a Cat Under a Full Moon (1992), This Woman in the Window (1993). In 1989, she became Annie Girardot's partner in Valery Akhadov's film Ruf. She voiced the Queen's Bichon, Milady and Bat in Dog in Boots film.

Muravyova is married to film director Leonid Eidlin. They had two sons: Daniil (b. 1975) and Yevgeniy (b. 1983).

Selected filmography
 A Very English Murder (1974) as Susan 
 Moscow Does Not Believe in Tears (1979) as Lyudmila Sviridova
 Fox Hunting (1980) as Marina Belova
 Carnival (1981) as Nina Solomatina
 The Most Charming and Attractive   (1985) as Nadya Klyueva
 Madam Bovary from Sliven (1991) as Vera
 Not Born Beautiful  (2005) as Yelena Aleksandrovna Pushkaryova
 One Night of Love  (2008) as Anna

Honours and awards
 Order of Merit for the Fatherland, 4th class (2006) - for outstanding contribution to the development of theatrical art as well as decades of creative activity
 Order of Honour (1999) - for outstanding contribution to the development of domestic theatrical culture, and in connection with the 175th Anniversary of the State Academic Maly Theatre of Russia
 Order of Friendship (2010) - for merits in development of national culture and art as well as decades of successful activity
 Medal "In Commemoration of the 850th Anniversary of Moscow"
 Order of the Badge of Honour (1983)
 USSR State Prize (1981, for her role in Moscow Does Not Believe in Tears)
 Honoured Artist of the RSFSR (1983)
 People's Artist of Russia (1994)
 Chekhov's Medal (2005)
 State Prize of the Russian Federation for work in the field of culture (2006)
 Commemorative Medal of the Ministry of Culture, "the 150th anniversary of Anton Chekhov" (2011)
 Honorary Worker of Culture of the Kuznetsk Basin (2007)
 Awarded the prize for the best role of an adult in the movie Best Grandmother at the VIII Festival of domestic films "Moscow Premiere" (2010) 
 National Film Award "Nika" "Best Actress" category,  for the film The Chinese Grandmother (2010)
 Awarded the prize for "Best Supporting Actor" at the "Constellation" (Sozvezdie) film festival (2011)

References

External links

1949 births
Living people
Soviet film actresses
Soviet television actresses
Soviet stage actresses
Russian film actresses
Russian television actresses
Russian stage actresses
Actresses from Moscow
Recipients of the USSR State Prize
Honored Artists of the RSFSR
People's Artists of Russia
Recipients of the Order of Honour (Russia)
State Prize of the Russian Federation laureates
Recipients of the Nika Award
Russian Academy of Theatre Arts alumni
20th-century Russian women
20th-century Russian actresses
21st-century Russian actresses